So Yokoku (蘇耀国, born September 11, 1979) is a professional Go player.

Biography 
So became a professional in 1994. He was originally from China, and moved to Japan in 1991.

Titles

References

External links 
 Nihon Ki-in page

1979 births
Living people
Chinese Go players
Sportspeople from Guangzhou
Japanese Go players
Chinese emigrants to Japan